Dylan Avery Holmes (born 22 March 1997) is an Australian professional women's footballer who plays as a midfielder for Adelaide United in the A-League Women.

Early life and education
Holmes was born to English and American parents in São Paulo, Brazil. In 2007, Holmes moved to Adelaide, South Australia. She attended Scotch College and  graduated in 2014 after doing well academically and being captain in her final year. Her home town is Heathfield, in the Adelaide Hills.

Club career

Adelaide United (2018–2021)
Holmes returned to Adelaide United for the first time since the 2014 W-League season where as she played only seven games. She played her first game for the season in a 0–0 against Melbourne Victory.

Adelaide City (2019–2021)
In February 2019, Holmes returned to Adelaide City ahead of the 2019 WNPL (Women's National Premier Leagues) season.

BK Häcken (2021) 
Holmes joined Swedish reigning champions Häcken ahead of the 2021 season, viewing the move as an opportunity "to play European football at a very high level".

Adelaide United (2021–)
In December 2021, after making 15 appearances in all competitions for Häcken, Holmes returned to Australia, re-joining Adelaide United for the remainder of the 2021–22 A-League Women season.

Style of play
Holmes is known for her composure on the ball and ability to control the tempo of games.

References

External links
 
 
 

1997 births
Living people
Adelaide United FC (A-League Women) players
BK Häcken FF players
A-League Women players
Women's association football defenders
Women's association football midfielders
Australian women's soccer players